Utah State Route 13 may refer to:

 Utah State Route 13, a state highway in Box Elder County in northern Utah, United States
 Utah State Route 13 (1962-1977), the former state designation for a section of U.S. Route 89 in Cache and Rich counties in northern Utah, United States
 Utah State Route 13 (1912-1962), a former state highway in Millard and Sevier counties in central Utah, United States, most of which is also known as Clear Creek Canyon Road

See also
 List of state highways in Utah
 List of highways numbered 13